A posthumous name is an honorary name given mainly to the illustrious dead in East Asian culture. It is predominantly practised in East Asian countries such as China, Korea, Vietnam, Japan, and Thailand. Reflecting on the person's accomplishments or reputation, the title is assigned after death and essentially replaces the name used during life. Although most posthumous names are given to royalty, some posthumous names are given to honour significant people without hereditary titles, such as courtiers or military generals.

Format
One or more adjectives are inserted before the deceased's title to make their posthumous name. Posthumous names are exclusively owned on the state level, although not necessarily on a broader national level. The name of the state or domain of the owner is added to avoid ambiguity from multiple similar posthumous names.

The Chinese language format for posthumous names is "[state][adjective][title]". When translated into English, they take on the format "[title] [adjective] of [state]", such as King Wen of Zhou ("Cultured King of Zhou"), Duke Mu of Qin ("Solemn Duke of Qin"), and King Cheng of Chu ("Accomplished King of Chu"). The literal meaning of the adjective usually needs to be translated.

The names of living Chinese people may be any combination of characters. Most often, posthumous names are chosen from a relatively small list, with the literal meaning of them being eroded as a result.

History

Origins
Early mythological rulers such as Emperor Yao were known to have posthumous names. Archaeological discoveries have shown that the titles of kings as far back as the Zhou dynasty are posthumous names, as in the cases of King Wu and King Wen, both Kings of Zhou, who died in 1043 BCE and 1050 BCE, respectively.

In the Zhou dynasty, the posthumous name was usually only one character, such as "Wen" (cultured) or "Wu" (martial). However, as time went on, rulers began adding more characters to their ancestors' posthumous names. By the time of the first emperor of Tang, the length had grown to 7 characters, which was taxing to pronounce or write. Therefore, emperors from the Tang are commonly referred to by either their temple name (Tang through Yuan dynasties) or era name (Ming and Qing dynasties), both of which are always two characters long.

Later developments
The use of posthumous names halted temporarily when the emperor Qin Shi Huang of the Qin dynasty proclaimed it disrespectful for the descendants of emperors to judge their elders by assigning them descriptive titles. The Han dynasty resumed using posthumous names after the fall of the Qin.

Posthumous names commonly made tracing linear genealogies simpler and kept a bloodline apparent. The rule was also followed by non-Han rulers of the Sixteen Kingdoms: Nanzhao, Liao dynasty, Western Xia, Jin dynasty, Yuan dynasty, Qing dynasty, Silla, Japan, and Vietnam. King names of Hồng Bàng dynasty and Mahan followed the rule but are considered later works.

Some rulers, such as Wu Zetian or rebel leaders, had similarly styled regnal names when they were alive.

Most monarchs inherited the throne and did not give negative posthumous names to the previous monarch. Later monarchs lengthened or changed some names; for example, Emperor Aizong of Jin and Chongzhen Emperor was referred to by different names by different people. Qin Hui of the Song dynasty had a name with a positive connotation, was given a negative one, and later had the positive name restored. After the Song dynasty, few received negative names. The disfavored monarchs of the Joseon dynasty did not receive posthumous names.

The emperors of China continued to receive posthumous names of increasing length as a matter of ritual long after the naming convention had been abandoned in casual speech and writing. The Guangxu Emperor, who died in 1908 and was the last emperor to receive a posthumous name, sports the impressive 21-character title of "Emperor Tongtian Chongyun Dazhong Zhizheng Jingwen Weiwu Renxiao Ruizhi Duanjian Kuanqin Jing".

Neither the first generation of new dynasties nor the rulers who were invalidated after the creation of the Republic of China were afforded titles; rulers such as Jian, King of Qi; Min, Marquis of Jin; and Chen Tuo are referred to by their living names. Puyi, the last emperor of China, did not receive a posthumous name upon his death in 1967 since he died at the height of the Cultural Revolution when such practices would have been thought feudal.

Use of posthumous names ceased in China with the Guangxu, as mentioned earlier, Emperor and in Vietnam with the Khải Định Emperor (died 1925).

Contemporary Use 
In the Republic of Korea, the Jeonju Lee Royal Family Association has issued posthumous names, albeit without the recognition of the republican government, to Empress Sunjeonghyo, Crown Prince Euimin and Gu, Prince Imperial Hoeun, in recent decades.

Official posthumous names are still used in Japan. A deceased emperor is given a posthumous name identical to his era name and, therefore, always two characters long. This tradition began with Emperor Meiji (d. 1912), and the most recently conferred posthumous name is Emperor Shōwa (d. 1989). A non-royal deceased person may be given a posthumous Buddhist name known as kaimyō but is, in practice, still referred to by the living name.

Guidelines

Selection
Posthumous names can be praises (褒字) or deprecations (貶字). There are more praises than deprecations, so posthumous names are also commonly called respectful names (尊號 zūnhào) in Chinese. Sima Qian's Records of the Grand Historian extensively outlines the rules behind choosing the names. 

Most qualifications for a given name are subjective, repetitive, and highly stereotypical, meaning posthumous names are often chosen arbitrarily. Court historians usually provide such names according to the deceased's notable deeds.

When combining an emperor's temple name and posthumous name, the temple name is placed first. For example, the Shunzhi Emperor, whose full posthumous title would be "Shizu, Emperor Zhang" (世祖章皇帝), combines his temple name and the last three characters of his posthumous reputation, which is the form most commonly seen in formal documents. A fuller description of this naming convention for royalty appears in the Chinese sovereign entry. Some monarchs' and royal members' posthumous names were extended, such as Hongwu Emperor, Nurhaci, Crown Prince Hyomyeong, Sunjo of Joseon and Empress Dowager Cixi.

Some monarchs did not follow these guidelines; for example, monarchs of Ju, Chu, and Qi used place names, while some monarchs of Yue (state) had Chinese transliterated posthumous words, and some monarchs of Goguryeo, Silla and Baekje had different style posthumous names. Some early Japanese monarchs also had Japanese-style posthumous names (和風諡号).

China

Monarchs and consorts

All Chinese posthumous names for rulers end in one or two of the characters for "emperor", huángdì (皇帝), which can be shortened to Dì, except about a dozen or so less recognized ones who have had only Dì and no Huáng.

Starting with Emperor Xiaowen of Han (more commonly "Emperor Wen"), every single Han emperor, except the first one of the Eastern Han Dynasty, has the character of "filial" (孝 xiào) at the beginning of his posthumous name. "Filial" is also used in the full posthumous names of virtually all emperors and empresses of the Tang, Song, Ming and Qing Dynasties. For Qing emperors, the character xiào is placed in various positions in the string of characters. For those Qing empresses given posthumous names, xiào is always initial.

The number of characters in posthumous names has drastically increased over time. The emperors of the Tang Dynasty have names between seven and eighteen characters. Most in the Qing Dynasty have over twenty characters. For instance, the Shunzhi Emperor’s name has 25 characters .  

Members of the ruling family

According to the noble system since the Zhou Dynasty, the immediate family members of the Emperor were given the titles of Kings (or Princes), Dukes, Earls, etc., with or without actual control over a region of land. After their death, they would be referred to by the same title, with the posthumous name (usually one character) inserted in the middle. The characters used are mainly those used for emperors, with the same denotations described above. For example, Prince Gong of the Qing Dynasty was posthumously named Zhong (忠) and thus is referred to as Prince Gongzhong (恭忠親王 Gongzhong qīnwáng); Prince Chun was posthumous named Xian (賢), hence is referred Prince Chunxian (醇賢親王 Chunxian qīnwáng). As for the exception, the posthumous name could include more than one character. For example, Prince Shuncheng Lekdehun was posthumously honoured as "Prince Shuncheng Gonghui" (多罗顺承恭惠郡王). Prince Yi of the First RankYinxiang was granted a posthumous name consisting of 9 characters "Zhongjing chengzhi qinshen lianming xian" (忠敬诚直勤慎廉明贤).

Officials
It was also common for people with no hereditary titles, primarily accomplished scholar-officials or ministers, to be given posthumous names by the imperial court. The characters used are mainly those used for emperors, with the same denotations described above. The length, however, was restricted to one or two characters. The posthumous name is sometimes rendered canonization in English, for the scholar-official to Confucianism is analogous to the saint in the Catholic Church. However, the process is shorter. See List of Posthumous Names for some examples.

Confucius has been given long posthumous names in almost every prominent dynasty. One of the most commonly used was Zhìshèngxiānshī (至聖先師).

Sometimes a person is given a posthumous name not by the court but by his family or disciples. Such names are private posthumous names (Sīshì, 私諡). For example, Tao Qian was given Sishi Jìngjié (靖節).

Korea
In Silla, every monarch was given the title of wang (왕, 王, "king") with two characters in posthumous names from Jijeung of Silla. On the other hand, all posthumous names for kings of Balhae were restricted to one character.

Most of the kings of Goryeo and Joseon were more often given temple names than posthumous names, unlike in the dynasties of ancient Korea. All posthumous names for the rulers of Goryeo and Joseon end in two of the characters for Daewang (대왕, 大王, "great king"). This is a longer name made up of adjectives characteristic of the king's rule. For example, Gwangjong of Goryeo's posthumous name was Hongdoseon Yeolpyeongse Sukheonui Hyoganghye Daeseong Daewang (홍도선열평세숙헌의효강혜대성대왕, 弘道宣烈平世肅憲懿孝康惠大成大王), while his temple name was Gwangjong. Details of the system of posthumous names were made during the Joseon Dynasty. The deposed king's names were made up of three parts: the temple name (묘호), eulogistic names (존호) and posthumous names (시호). During the Joseon Dynasty, officials discussed and decided on the king's posthumous name five days after the king's funeral. The deceased king, who, before his temple and posthumous names were chosen, was called Daehaeng daewang (대행대왕, 大行大王). The Ministry of Culture and Education (예조, 禮曹) was in charge of the naming. When officials of the ministry of culture and education selected three candidates and reported them to the next king, the next king chose one of the names that he liked best. Also, Shorn of his power, the deposed king has not been given any posthumous names with temple names unless reinstated. They were degraded to the rank of a gun (군, 君, "prince"). Yeonsan-gun and Gwanghae-gun were notable examples. And some men didn't ascend to the throne in their lifetime but were proclaimed kings after they died by their descendants who became kings. Nine men were proclaimed kings in the Joseon Dynasty. In Joseon, nine men were raised to the status of emeritus kings.

Gojong of Joseon proclaimed Korea an empire in 1897, receiving the title of emperor, thus the posthumous names of Gojong and Sunjong end in two of the characters for Hwangje (황제, 皇帝, "emperor"). For example, the full posthumous name of Emperor Gojong of Korea is Tongcheonyung-un Jogeukdonyun Jeongseonggwang-ui Myeonggongdaedeok Yojunsunhwi Umotanggyeong Eungmyeongripgi Jihwasinryeol Oehunhong-eop Gyegiseonryeok Geonhaenggonjeong Yeong-uihonghyu Sugangmunheon Mujanginik Jeonghyo Taehwangje (통천융운조극돈윤정성광의명공대덕요준순휘우모탕경응명립기지화신렬외훈홍업계기선력건행곤정영의홍휴수강문헌무장인익정효태황제, 統天隆運 肇極敦倫 正聖光義 明功大德 堯峻舜徽 禹謨湯敬 應命立紀 至化神烈 巍勳洪業 啓基宣曆 乾行坤定 英毅弘休 壽康文憲 武章仁翼 貞孝太皇帝), or Taehwangje for short.

Crown Prince Hyomyeong has been given the longest posthumous name in Korea. He was posthumously elevated in status and given the title Emperor Munjo with 117 characters in posthumous names in 1899.

Japan
In Japan, posthumous names are divided into two types: shigō (諡号) or okuri-na (諡), which describes the accomplishments and the virtues of the rulers, and tsuigō (追号), which are derived from the name of locations and era names, among others. Those Japanese emperors are also sometimes called teigō (帝号, "emperor name[s]").

There are two styles of emperors' shigō, namely Chinese-style or Han style (漢風諡号) and Japanese style (和風諡号). In addition to the appellation, Tennō (天皇, "heavenly sovereign", usually translated as Emperor) is a part of all Japanese emperors' posthumous names, most of them consisting of two kanji characters, although a few consist of three. Some names are given several generations later—this is the case for Emperor Jimmu and Emperor Antoku, for example. Others are provided immediately after death, like that Emperor Monmu.

The posthumous name of some emperors was derived from the combination of characters from two previous emperors' posthumous names:
 Empress Genmei (元明天皇 Genmei Tennō) + Empress Genshō (元正天皇 Genshō Tennō) = Empress Meishō (明正天皇 Meishō Tennō)
 Empress Shōtoku (称徳天皇 Shōtoku Tennō) + Emperor Kōnin (光仁天皇 Kōnin Tennō) = Emperor Shōkō (称光天皇 Shōkō Tennō)

Chinese-style (Han-style) shigō
For example:
 Emperor Jimmu (神武天皇 Jinmu Tennō, lit. "Divine Might")
 Emperor Nintoku (仁徳天皇 Nintoku Tennō, lit. "Benevolent and Virtuous")
 Emperor Ōjin (応神天皇 Ōjin Tennō, lit. "Answering the Deities")

Japanese-style shigō
For example,
 Ōhatsuse Wakatake no Sumera-mikoto (大泊瀬幼武天皇), better known by his Chinese-style shigō of Emperor Yūryaku (雄略天皇 Yūryaku Tennō, lit. "Mighty Strategist")
 Nunakuranofutotamashiki no Sumeramikoto (渟中倉太珠敷天皇), better known by his Chinese-style shigō of Emperor Bidatsu (敏達天皇 Bidatsu Tennō, lit. "Intelligent and Virtuous")

Tsuigō
For example:
 those who were named after the place where the emperor was born, lived or frequented:
 Emperor Saga (嵯峨天皇 Saga Tennō), named after a palace (院 in)
 Emperor Ichijō (一条天皇 Ichijō Tennō), named after an official residence (邸 tei)
 Emperor Kōmyō (光明天皇 Kōmyō Tennō), named after a temple
 Emperor Higashiyama (東山天皇 Higashiyama Tennō), named after a hill
 Emperor Meiji (明治天皇 Meiji Tennō), named after his era name
 those who were named after an emperor whose admirable characteristics resemble those of an earlier one by adding Go (後, lit. latter) as a prefix to the earlier emperor's name:
 Emperor Go-Ichijō (後一条天皇 Go-Ichijō Tennō)
 Emperor Go-Daigo (後醍醐天皇 Go-Daigo Tennō)
 Empress Go-Sakuramachi (後桜町天皇 Go-Sakuramachi Tennō)

Since the death of Emperor Meiji (明治天皇 Meiji Tennō) in 1912, the posthumous name of an emperor has always been the era name of his reign. In such cases, the posthumous names belong to the category of tsuigō. For example, after his death, Hirohito (by which he is usually called outside Japan) was formally renamed Emperor Shōwa (昭和天皇 Shōwa Tennō) after his era; Japanese now refer to him by only that name. Hirohito was his given name; most Japanese never refer to their emperors by their names, which is considered disrespectful.

Thailand

Since the death of king Chulalongkorn in 1910, the reign name of a king has always been the name of his reigning era, formally used in the Royal Thai Government Gazette. Some were given posthumous names to elevate their title, such as in the case of King Ananda's title Phra Athamaramathibodin. Kings Ananda and Bhumibol don't have specific reign names, and other kings, such as Chulalongkorn, are referred to using personal names; however, most Thai people never refer to their king by their unique name or the informal Chula Chom Klao, as it is considered disrespectful. The personal name of the current king, Vajiralongkorn, will continue to be regarded as casual until his death when it will be replaced with the reign name Vajilaklao.

See also
Chinese name
Korean name
Japanese name
List of monarchs of Korea
Emperor of Japan
Vietnamese name
Thai name
Taboo against naming the dead

References

Citations

Sources 

 

Ancient Korean institutions
Ancient Chinese institutions
Human names
Chinese monarchs
Chinese culture
Korean rulers
Korean culture
Vietnamese monarchs
Vietnamese culture
Japanese monarchs
Japanese culture
Thai monarchy
Posthumous recognitions